Peña Sport Fútbol Club is a Spanish football team based in Tafalla, in the autonomous community of Navarre. Founded in 1925 it plays in Segunda División RFEF – Group 2, holding home matches at Campo de San Francisco, with a capacity of 4,000 seaters.

History 
Peña Sport FC was founded in autumn of 1925 by merger of youth teams of the Tafalla city.

Season to season

10 seasons in Segunda División B
1 season in Segunda División RFEF
38 seasons in Tercera División

Current squad

Famous players
 Raúl Iturralde

References

External links
Official website 
Futbolme team profile 

Football clubs in Navarre
Association football clubs established in 1925
1925 establishments in Spain